Senator Elkins may refer to:

Davis Elkins (1876–1959), U.S. Senator from West Virginia.
Luther Elkins (1809–1887), Oregon State Senate
Stephen Benton Elkins (1841–1911), U.S. Senator from West Virginia